List of hospitals in Nashville, Tennessee (U.S. state), sorted alphabetically.

Hospitals
 Millie E. Hale Hospital (19161938)
 Monroe Carell Jr. Children's Hospital at Vanderbilt
 Nashville General Hospital
 Saint Thomas–Midtown
 Saint Thomas West
 The Children's Hospital at TriStar Centennial
 TriStar Centennial Medical Center
 TriStar Skyline Medical Center
 TriStar Southern Hills Medical Center
 TriStar Summit Medical Center
 Vanderbilt Psychiatric Hospital
 Vanderbilt Stallworth Rehabilitation Hospital
 Vanderbilt University Medical Center
 Veterans Affairs Medical Center
 Tristar Mount Juliet - Freestanding ER

External links

Hospitals

Nashville
Tennessee, Nashville